Katha nigropoda is a moth of the family Erebidae first described by Otto Vasilievich Bremer and William Grey in 1852. It is found in Russia (Primorye, Ussurijsk) and China (Beijing, Shanghai, Zhejiang, Fujiang).

References

Moths described in 1852
Lithosiina